Murray Beresford Roberts (10 August 1919 – 5 August 1974) was an Australian-New Zealand confidence trickster and thief.

Biography
Roberts was born in Wellington, New Zealand in 1919. When his parents lived in Double Bay, New South Wales he went to Newington College in Sydney  and later to Auckland Grammar School in New Zealand.

After dropping out of the University of Otago medical school when caught cheating at an exam Roberts spent his life impersonating medics, military men, writers and academics. When each charade fell through, he would move to a new town and new circle of targets. One of his employers was his Sydney alma mater, Newington College, until his lack of teaching credentials became apparent.

Roberts' roles included Assistant medical director of the New Zealand Division (Army), a naval surgeon commander, governor general designate, professor of neuropsychiatry, manager of Barclays Bank, a major-general, atomic scientist, High Court judge, famous German industrialist, a well-known author, professor of Classics. Many seem to have been undertaken for the pleasure he obtained rather than financial gain.

Roberts had a son from the first of his two marriages made in Australia. He died in Papakura New Zealand 5 August 1974. His autobiography was published posthumously.

References

External links
Bad, Graham Hutchins, Hodder-Moa, Auckland, 2010, pages 1947–1954, 

1919 births
1974 deaths
New Zealand criminals
People from Wellington City
People educated at Newington College
People educated at Auckland Grammar School
Confidence tricksters
New Zealand expatriates in Australia